Jaba Bregvadze (born 24 April 1987) is a Georgian rugby union player. His position is hooker. Who plays for 
Japanese club Kubota Spears Funabashi Tokyo Bay

Bregvadze played for Stade Toulousain in the Top 14 and Worcester Warriors. Currently he plays for Kubota Spears in Japan Rugby League One. He also plays for the Georgia national team. He played for Georgia in the 2011 Rugby World Cup and the 2015 Rugby World Cup.

References

1987 births
Living people
Rugby union players from Georgia (country)
Rugby union players from Tbilisi
Stade Toulousain players
Rugby union hookers
Expatriate rugby union players from Georgia (country)
Expatriate rugby union players in France
Expatriate sportspeople from Georgia (country) in France
Georgia international rugby union players
Sunwolves players
Worcester Warriors players
SU Agen Lot-et-Garonne players
Kubota Spears Funabashi Tokyo Bay players
The Black Lion players